Melo is a coastal island in Guinea-Bissau. It is located between the mouths of rivers Cumbijã and Cacine. Its maximum elevation is 8 m.

See also
List of islands of Guinea-Bissau

References 

Atlantic islands of Guinea-Bissau